Hero Illustrated was a comic book-themed magazine published in the early to mid-1990s in the United States. Columnists included Andy Mangels, and Frank Kurtz was at one time a managing editor. The journal won the 1995 Eisner Award for Best Comics-Related Periodical/Publication.

History 
Hero Illustrated was published by Warrior Publications of Lombard, Illinois. Its premiere issue was dated July 1993 and it ceased publication in the spring of 1996.

Specials 
In addition to at least 26 regular issues, numerous specials were published, including Hero Premiere Editions (a series of ashcan copy printings of forthcoming comics), Hero Illustrated Specials, and Hero Special Editions.

 Hero Premiere Editions
 Bone Holiday Special (1993)
 Charlemagne (inside Hero Illustrated #9 (1993))
 Extreme Hero (1994)
 Hero Illustrated Specials
 Batman Special #1
 Sci-Fi Special
 Star Wars: Dark Empire II #1
 Top 100 Special
 Villains Special #1
 X Special: Will to Power
 The X-Files (March 1995)
 Year End Special 1993
 Year End Special 1994
 Hero Special Editions
 1993: The Year in Comics ((vol. 1) 1994)
 Comic Book Villains: The Baddest of the Bad - Anti-Hero Special Edition ((vol. 2) 1994)
 The 100 Most Important Comics of All Time ((vol. 4) 1994)
 Comic Book Who's Who: Complete Biographies on the Hottest Comic Book Characters! ((vol. 6) 1994)
 Hero 1994 Yearbook: the ups and downs, the best and the worst, the people and the events that rocked the world in comics in 1994! ((vol. 8) 1994)

References

1993 establishments in Illinois
1996 disestablishments in Illinois
Monthly magazines published in the United States
Eisner Award winners for Best Comics-Related Periodical/Journalism
Magazines about comics
Magazines established in 1993
Magazines disestablished in 1996
Magazines published in Illinois
Defunct magazines published in the United States